Events from the year 1705 in art.

Events
 The Venetian painter Rosalba Carriera becomes the first woman elected to the Accademia di San Luca in Rome.

Paintings
 Federiko Benković – Juno on the Clouds
 Michael Dahl – Queen Anne
 Sebastiano Ricci
 The Battle of the Lapiths and the Centaurs
 The Vision of St. Bruno

Births
 February 15 – Charles-André van Loo, French subject painter (died 1765), and a younger brother of Jean-Baptiste van Loo
 June 1 – Carl Marcus Tuscher, German-born Danish polymath, portrait painter, printmaker, architect, and decorator (died 1751)
 August 18 – Emanuel Büchel, Swiss painter (died 1775)
 date unknown
 Jean Barbault, French painter and engraver (died 1765/1766)
 Andrés de la Calleja, Spanish painter (died 1785)
 Andrea Casali, Italian painter of the Rococo period (died 1784)
 Carlo Costanzi, Italian gem engraver of the late-Baroque period (died 1781)
 Claude Drevet – French portrait engraver (died 1782)
 Robert Feke, American painter (died 1750)
 Johan Graham, painter from London active in The Hague and Amsterdam (died 1775)
 Matthäus Günther, German painter and artist of the Baroque and Rococo era (died 1788)
 Jakob Klukstad, Norwegian wood carver and painter (died 1773)
 José Ramírez de Arellano, Spanish Baroque architect and sculptor (died 1770)
 1704/1705: Jan Jerzy Plersch, Polish sculptor of German origin (died 1774)

Deaths
 January 5 – Georg Christoph Eimmart, German draughtsman and engraver (born 1638)
 January 12 – Luca Giordano, Italian late Baroque painter and printmaker in etching (born 1634)
 March 28 – Gaspard Rigaud, French painter and portraitist (born 1661)
 June 16 – Adriaen van der Cabel, Dutch painter of the Dutch school (born 1631)
 July 16 – François Lespingola, French sculptor (born 1644)
 September 15 – Orazio Talami, Italian Baroque painter (born 1624)
 date unknown
 Zhu Da, Chinese painter of shuimohua and a calligrapher (born 1626)
 Claude Bertin, French sculptor for the Palace of Versailles (date of birth unknown)
 Giuseppe Diamantini, Italian painter and printmaker of the Baroque period (born 1621)
 Antonio Giusti, Italian painter, active mainly in Florence (born 1624)
 Andrea Miglionico, Italian painter of historical subjects (date of birth unknown)
 Francisco Meneses Osorio, Spanish painter  (born 1630)
 Daniel Seiter, Viennese-born fresco painter of the Baroque (born 1642/1647)
 Bada Shanren, Chinese painter of shuimohua and a calligrapher (born 1626)
 Zhou Shuxi, female Chinese painter in Qing Dynasty (born 1624)

 
Years of the 18th century in art
1700s in art